

World Athletics Series

 March 4 & 5: 2022 World Athletics Race Walking Team Championships in  Muscat
 10 km: Wang Hongren (m) /  Jiang Yunyan (f)
 20 km: Toshikazu Yamanishi (m) /  Ma Zhenxia (f)
 35 km: Perseus Karlström (m) /  Glenda Morejón (f)
 March 12: 2022 FISU Cross Country Championships in  Leiria
 XC 10 km:  Dismas Yeko (m) /  Glenda Morejón (f)
 March 18 – 20: 2022 World Athletics Indoor Championships in  Belgrade
60 metres:  Marcell Jacobs (m) /  Mujinga Kambundji (f)
400 metres:  Jereem Richards (m) /  Shaunae Miller-Uibo (f)
800 metres:  Mariano García (m) /  Ajee Wilson (f)
1500 metres:  Samuel Tefera (m) /  Gudaf Tsegay (f)
3000 metres:  Selemon Barega (m) /  Lemlem Hailu (f)
60 metres hurdles:  Grant Holloway (m) /   Cyréna Samba-Mayela (f)
4 × 400 metres relay:  (m) /  (f)
High jump:  Woo Sang-hyeok (m) /  Yaroslava Mahuchikh (f)
Pole vault:  Armand Duplantis (m) /  Sandi Morris (f)
Long jump:   Miltiadis Tentoglou  (m) /  Ivana Vuleta (f)
Triple jump:  Lázaro Martínez (m) /  Yulimar Rojas (f)
Shot put:  Darlan Romani (m) /  Auriol Dongmo (f)
 June 30 – July 5: 2021 Summer World University Games in  Chengdu
 July 15 – 24: 2022 World Athletics Championships in  Eugene
 August 1 – 6: 2022 World Athletics U20 Championships in  Cali
 November 13: 2022 World Athletics Half Marathon Championships in  Yangzhou

Areas, Regional and Continental Championships
 February 5 & 6: South American Race Walking Championships in  Lima
 35 km winners:  Luis Henry Campos (m) /  Paola Pérez (f)
 20 km winners:  César Rodríguez (m) /  Glenda Morejón (f)
 February 6: European Champion Clubs Cup Cross Country in  Oeiras
 Winners:  Rodrigue Kwizera (m) /  Likina Amebaw (f)
 U20 winners:  Dean Casey (m) /  Ilona Mononen (f)
 Team winners:  Ankara Ego (Polat Kemboi Arıkan, Yemane Haileselassie, İlham Tanui Özbilen, Üzeyir Söylemez) (m) /  CA Playas de Castellón (Likina Amebaw, Blanca Fernández, Cristina Espejo, Clara Viñaras) (f)
 Team U20 winners:  Ennis Track AC (Dean Casey, Dylan Casey, Niall Murphy, Mark Hanrahan) (m) /  AC Mica Romă (Iulia Mărginean, Alexandra Hudea, Mihaela Blaga, Andrea Bogdan) (f)
February 13: Oceania Open 20 km Race Walking Championships in  Adelaide
 Winners:  Declan Tingay (m) /  Jemima Montag (f)
 February 19 & 20: 2022 South American Indoor Championships in Athletics in  Cochabamba
60 metres:  Felipe Bardi dos Santos (m) /  Rosângela Santos (f)
400 metres:  Lucas Carvalho (m) /  Tábata de Carvalho (f)
800 metres:  Lucirio Antonio Garrido (m) /  Deborah Rodríguez (f)
1500 metres:  David Ninavia (m) /  Jhoselyn Camargo (f)
3000 metres:  Daniel Toroya (m) /  Lizeth Veizaga (f)
60 metres hurdles:  Rafael Pereira (m) /  Ketiley Batista (f)
4 × 400 metres relay: (m) /  (f)
High jump:  Thiago Moura (m) /  Sarah Freitas (f)
Pole vault:  Augusto Dutra de Oliveira (m) /  Isabel de Quadros (f)
Long jump:  José Luis Mandros (m) /  Nathalee Aranda (f)
Triple jump:  Alexsandro Melo (m) /  Gabriele dos Santos (f)
Shot put:  Darlan Romani (m) /  Livia Avancini (f)
Heptathlon:  Felipe Vinícius dos Santos (m)
Pentathlon:  Raiane Procópio
 February 20: 2022 Central American Race Walking Championship in  San Salvador
 20 km winners:  Érick Barrondo (m) /  Yasury Palacios (f)
 March 5: 2022 Balkan Indoor Championships in  Istanbul
 60 m winners:  Kayhan Özer (m) /  Olivia Fotopoulou (f)
 400 m winners:  Ilyas Çanakçi (m) /  Anita Horvat (f)
 800 m winners:  Abedin Mujezinović (m) /  Tuğba Toptaš (f)
 1500 m winners:  Mehmet Çelík (m) /  Šilan Ayyildiz (f)
 3000 m winners:  Vid Botolin (m) /  Luiza Gega (f)
 60 m Hurdles winners:  Alin Ionuț Anton (m) /  Anamaria Nesteriuc (f)
 High Jump winners:  Božidar Marković (m) /  Mirela Demireva (f)
 Pole Vault winners:  Riccardo Klotz (m) /  Eleni-Klaoudia Polak (f)
 Long Jump winners:  Izmir Smajlaj (m) /  Vasiliki Chaitidou (f)
 Triple Jump winners:  Levon Aghasyan (m) /  Tuğba Danișmaz (f)
 Shot put winners:  Giorgi Mujaridze (m) /  Pinar Akyol (f)
  winners:  (Remus Niculita, Mihai Dringo, Denis Toma, Robert Parge) (m) /  (Agata Zupin, Jerneja Smonkar, Veronika Sadek, Anita Horvat) (f)
 February 15: Banskobystricka latka in  Banská Bystrica
 High Jump winners:  Sanghyeok Woo (m) /  Eleanor Patterson (f)
 March 27: 2022 Pan American Cross Country Cup in  Serra
 April 16 – 18: 2022 RIFTA Games in  Kingston
 May 14 – 15: 2022 NACAC Combined Events Championship  Ottawa
 May 15: 2022 Oceania Open 35 km Race Walking Championship  Melbourne
 May 22: 2022 South American Marathon Championships  Asunción
 June 8 – 12: 2022 African Athletics Championships in  St. Pierre
 June 11: 2022 Championships of the Small States of Europe in  Marsa
 June 29 – July 3: 2022 Caribbean Games (U23) in  Guadeloupe
 July 1 – 4:  XIX Mediterranean Games (Athletics) in Oran 
 July 4 – 7: 2022 European Athletics U18 Championships in  Jerusalem
 August 15 – 21: 2022 European Athletics Championships in  Munich
 August 16 – 22: 19th Asian Games in  Hangzhou
 August 19 – 21: 2022 NACAC Championships in  Nassau
 August 21: 2022 South American Half Marathon Championships  Buenos Aires
 September 9 – 11: 2022 South American Athletics U18 Championships  São Paulo
 September 30 – October 2: 2022 South American Athletics U23 Championships in  Cascavel
 October 12 – 15: 2022 South American Games in  Asunción
 TBA:  4th Asian U18 Athletics Championships in  Al-Kuwait

2022 World Athletics Label Road Races

Elite Platinum
 March 6: Tokyo Marathon in  Tokyo
 Winners:  Eliud Kipchoge (m) /  Brigid Kosgei (f)
 March 13: Nagoya Women's Marathon in  Nagoya (Only women's)
 Winners:  Ruth Chepngetich
 April 10: C&D Xiamen Marathon in  Xiamen
 April 17: Seoul Marathon in  Seoul
 April 18: Boston Marathon in  Boston

Elite
 January 16: Houston Half Marathon in  Houston
 Winners:  Milkesa Mengesha (m) /  Vicoty Chepngeno (f)
 January 16: Houston Marathon in  Houston
 Winners:  James Ngandu (m) /  Keira D'Amato (f)
 January 30: Osaka International Ladies Marathon in  Osaka
 Winner:  Mizuki Matsuda
 February 12: Lagos City Marathon in  Lagos
 Winners:  Dagne Siranesh Yirga (m) /  Ulfata Gelata (f)
 February 19: Ras Al Khaimah Half Marathon in  Ras Al Khaimah
 Winners:  Jacob Kiplimo (m) /  Girmawit Gebrzihair (f)
 February 20: Sevilla Marathon in  Sevilla
 Winners:  Asrar Abderehman (m) /  Alemu Megertu (f)
 February 20: XXXVI Medio Maraton Internacional Guadalajara Electrolit in  Guadalajara
 Winners:  Rhonzai Lokitam Kilimo (m) /  Besu Sado (f)
 February 27: The Combined 10th Osaka Marathon and 77th Lake Biwa Marathon in  Osaka
 Winners:  Gaku Hoshi (m) /  Misato Horie (f)
 March 5: Riyadh Marathon in  Riyadh
 Winners:  Tsegaye Getachew (m) /  Tadu Teshome  (f)
 March 6: Nedbank #Runified 50 km in  Gqeberha
 Winner:  Stephen Mokoka
 Cancelled: Marathon International de Rabat in  Rabat
 Postponed: Xuzhou Marathon in  Xuzhou
 March 20: New Taipei City Wan Jin Shi Marathon in  New Taipei City
 Winners:  Felix Kimutai (m) /  Motu Megersa (f)
 March 27: N Kolay Istanbul Half Marathon in  Istanbul
 TBD: Mumbai Marathon in  Mumbai

Label
 January 9: 10K Valencia Ibercaja in  Valencia
 Winners:  Daniel Ebenyo (m) /  Norah Jeruto (f)
 January 22: Buriram Marathon in  Buriram
 Winners:  Sergey Zyryanov (m) /  Aleksandra Morozova (f)
 January 23: XXX Mitja Marató Internacional Vila de Santa Pola in  Santa Pola
 Winners:  Felix Kibitok (m) /  Pauline Esikon (f)
 February 25: Tel Aviv Marathon in 
 Winners:  Vincent Kipsang Rono (m) /  Mentamir Bikayia (f)
 February 26: Amazing Thailand 10k Bangkok in  Bangkok
 Winner:  Krzysztof Hadas
 February 27: Napoli City Half Marathon in  Napoli
 Winners:  Yemaneberhan Crippa (m) /  Gladys Chepkurui (f)
 February 27: Amazing Thailand Marathon Bangkok in  Bangkok
 Winners:  David Kibet (m) /  Aleksandra Morozova (f)
 February 27: Maratón BP Castellón in  Castellón
 Winners:  Ronald Korir (m) /  Betty Jepleting (f)
 February 27: Amazing Thailand Half Marathon Bangkok in  Bangkok
 Winners:  Nattawut Innum (m) /  Aoranuch Aiamtas (f)
 March 5: Riyadh Half Marathon in  Riyadh
 Winners:  Geofry Toroitich (m) /  Daisy Cherotich (f)
 March 6: RomaOstia Half Marathon in  Roma
 Winners:  Sabastian Kimaru Sawe (m) /  Irine Jepchumba Kimais (f)
 March 26: Azkoitia Azpeitia Diego Garcia Memorial in  Azpeitia
 March 27: Run Rome The Marathon in  Roma
 March 27: Tashkent International Marathon in  Tashkent
 March 27: Kiss-Run Pukou Women's Half Marathon in  Nanjing
 March 27: Zagreb 21 powered by Heineken 0,0 in  Zagreb
 TBD: Zheng-Kai International Marathon in  Zhengzhou
 Postponed Suzhou Jinji Lake International Half Marathon in  Suzhou

2022 World Athletics Continental Tour
Bronze
 February 20: Sir Graeme Douglas International in  Auckland
 100 m winners:  Lex Revell-Lewis (m) /  Zoe Hobbs (f)
 400 m winners:  James Ford (m) /  Rosie Elliot (f)
 1500 m winners:  Julian Oakley (m) /  Laura Nagel (f)
 Men's 5000 m winner:  Hayden Wilde
 Women's 400 m hurdles winner:  Portia Bing
 Discus Throw winners:  Connor Bell (m) /  Savannah Scheen (f)
 Hammer Throw winners:  Anthony Nobilo (m) /  Lauren Bruce (f)
 High Jump winners:  Hamish Kerr (m) /  Keeley O'hagan (f)
 Men's Long Jump winners:  Felix McDonald
 Pole Vault winners:  Nicholas Southgate (m) /  Olivia McTaggart (f)
 Shot Put winners:  Tom Walsh (m) /  Maddison-Lee Wesche (f)
 Women's Javelin Throw winner:  Tori Peeters
 February 26: International Track Meet in  Christchurch
 200 m winners:  Tiaan Whelpton (m) /  Katherine Camp (f)
 Mile winners:  Hayden Wilde (m) /  Penelope Salmon (f)
 Men's 110 m hurdles winners:  Joshua Hawkins
 Women's 100 m hurdles winner:  Maggie Jones
 Discus Throw winners:  Kieran Fowler (m) /  Tatiana Kaumoana (f)
 Hammer Throw winners:  Anthony Nobilo (m) /  Lauren Bruce (f)
 High Jump winners:  Hamish Kerr (m) /  Keeley O'hagan (f)
 Triple Jump winners:  Scott Thompson (m) /  Anna Thompson (f)
 Shot Put winners:  Tom Walsh (m) /  Tapenisa Havea (f)
 February 26: Sydney Track Classic in  Sydney
60 metres:  Edward Osei-Nketia (m) /  Abbie Taddeo (f)
100 metres:  Edward Osei-Nketia (m) /  Ella Connolly (f)
400 metres:  Alex Beck (m) /  Ella Connolly (f)
800 metres:  Peter Bol (m) /  Bendere Oboya (f)
3000 metres:  Jude Thomas (m) /  Rosa Davies (f)
Men's 110 metres hurdles:  Nicholas Hough
Women's 100 metres hurdles:  Liz Clay
Women's 400 metres hurdles:  Portia Bing
High jump:  Joel Baden (m) /  Keeley O'Hagan  (f)
Pole vault:  Dalton Di Medio (m) /  Courtney Smallacombe (f)
Triple jump:   Ayo Ore  (m) /  Desleigh Owushu (f)
Women's Shot Put:  Sally Shokry
Discus Throw:  Matthew Denny /  Jade Lally (f)
Harmer Throw:  Ned Weatherly (m) /  Alexandra Hulley (f)
 March 19: Melbourne Track Classic in  Melbourne
 100 m winners:  Jacob Despard (m) /  Celeste Mucci (f)
 200 m winners:  Calab Law (m) /  Ella Connolly (f)
 Men's 800 m winners:  James Preston
 1500 m winners:  Thomas Thorpe (m) /  Abbey Caldwell (f)
 400 m hurdles winners:  Mark Fokas (m) /  Portia Bing (f)
 3000 m steeplechase winners:  Kosei Yamaguchi (m) /  Brielle Erbacher (f)
 Long Jump winners:  Christopher Mitrevski (m) /  Samantha Dale (f)
 Men's Shot Put winner:  Damien Birkinhead
 Javelin Throw winner:  Cameron Mcentyre (m) /  Mackenzie Little (f)
  winners) (m) /  (f)

Challenger
 January 22: Potts Classic in  Hastings
 100 m winners:  Tiaan Whelpton (m) /  Zoe Hobbs (f)
 800 m winners:  James Preston (m) /  Rebekah Greene (f)
 3000 m winners:  Sam Tanner (m) /  Kara MacDermid (f)
 Discus Throw winners:  Connor Bell (m) /  Savannah Scheen (f)
 Hammer Throw winners:  Anthony Nobilo (m) /  Lauren Bruce (f)
 Long Jump winners:  Angus Lyver (m) /  Mariah Ririnui (f)
 Pole Vault winners:  James Steyn (m) /  Olivia McTaggart (f)
 Shot Put winners:  Tom Walsh (m) /  Valerie Adams (f)
 January 26: Zatopek Classic in  Melbourne
 800 m winners:  Tom March (m) /  Catriona Bisset (f)
 1500 m winners:  Luke Young (m) /  Claudia Hollingsworth (f)
 10000 m winners:  Jack Rayner (m) /  Rose Davies (f)
 Pole Vault winners:  Dalton Di Medio (m) /  Cassidy Bradshaw (f)
 Long Jump winners:  Amiru Chandrasena (m) /  Chloe Grenade (f)
 January 30: Cooks Classic in  Whanganui
 200 m winners:  Zachary Saunders (m) /  Georgia Hulls (f)
 400 m winners:  Joshua Ledger (m) /  Izzy Neal (f)
 Men's 800 m winner:  James Preston
 Women's 400 m Hurdles winner:  Alessandra Macdonald
 High Jump winners:  Hamish Kerr (m) /  Keeley O'Hagan (f)
 Women's Hammer Throw winner:  Lauren Bruce
 Javelin Throw winners:  Jared Neighbours (m) /  Tori Peeters (f)
 Triple Jump winners:  Scott Thomson (m) /  Anna Thomson (f)
 Shot Put winners:  Tom Walsh (m) /  Lauren Bruce (f)
 February 4: Capital Classic in  Wellington
 200 m winners:  Zachary Saunders (m) /  Georgia Hulls (f)
 Women's 800 m winner:  Holly Manning
 1500 m winners:  Julian Oakley (m) /  Laura Nagel (f)
 Men's 110 m Hurdles winner:  Tom Moloney
 Women's 100 m Hurdles winner:  Amy Robertson
 Men's 3000 m Steeplechase winner:  George Guerin
 High Jump winners:  Marcus Wolton (m) /  Keeley O'Hagan (f)
 Long Jump winners:  Felix McDonald (m) /  Ashleigh Bennett (f)
 Triple Jump winners:  Scott Thomson (m) /  Anna Thomson (f)
 Hammer Throw winners:  Anthony Nobilo (m) /  Lauren Bruce
 Javelin Throw winner:  Jared Neighbours (m) /  Tori Peeters (f)
 Shot Put winners:  Tom Walsh (m) /  Tapenisa Havea (f)
 February 5: Sola Power Throws Meet in  Wellington
 Discus Throw winners:  Nathaniel Sulupo (m) /  Tatiana Kaumoana (f)
 Shot Put winners:  Blessing Sefo (m) /  Tapenisa Havea (f)
 February 12: Adelaide Track Classic in  Adelaide
 100 m winners:  Rohan Browning (m) /  Ella Connolly (f)
 200 m winners:  Aidan Murphy (m) /  Riley Day (f)
 800 m winners:  Peter Bol (m) /  Bendere Oboya (f)
 5000 m winners:  Sam McEntee (m) /  Isobel Batt-Doyle (f)
 3000 m Steeplechase winners:  Ben Buckingham (m) /  Cara Feain-Ryan (f)
 Women's Pole Vault winner:  Courtney Smallacombe
 Triple Jump winners:  Julian Konle (m) /  Desleigh Owusu (f)
 Men's Discus Throw winner:  Lachlan Page
 March 16: ASA Athletics Grand Prix 1 in  Bloemfontein
 100 m winners:  Jarryd Crossman (m) /  Yave Collins (f)
 400 m winners:  Oratile Setlhabi (m) /  Anname Fourie (f)
 800 m winners:  Jabulane Ncamane (m) /  Danielle Verster (f)
 Men's 110 metre hurdles winner:  Antonio Alkana
 Women's 100 metre hurdles winner:  Marione Fourie
 Long Jump winners:  Jovan Van Vuuren (m) /  Lene Peens (f)
 Men's Shot Put winner:  Jason Van Rooyen
 Men's Harmer Throw winner:  Allan Cumming
 Women's Discus Throw winner:  Yolandi Stander
 March 17–19: 16th Annual Spring Break Classic in  Carolina
 100 m winners:  Donatien Djero (m) /  Kenyatta Grate (f)
 200 m winners:  Steven Gardiner (m) /  Jasmine Camacho-Quinn (f)
 Men's 300 m winner:  Andrew Hudson
 400 m winners:  Nicardo Blake (m) /  Imani Gray (f)
 800 m winners:  Derick Ortega (m) /  Tessa McClain (f)
 1500 m winners:  Hector Pagan (m) /  Carolina Lozano (f)
 5000 m winners:  Samuel Morales (m) /  Jorelis Vargas (f)
 Men's 110 metre hurdles winner:  Angel Ruiz
 Women's 100 metre hurdles winner:  Paola Vazquez
 400 m hurdles winners:  Angel Ruiz (m) /  Grace Claxton (f)
 High Jump winners:  Luis Castro Rivera (m) /  Dominique Biron (f)
 Pole Vault winners:  Gabriel Cumba (m) /  Viviana Quintana (f)
 Long Jump winners:  Shawn Díaz (m) /  Paola Fernandez (f)
 Triple Jump winners:  Andres Felipe Murillo (m) /  Yuli Andrea Quinto (f)
 Shot Put winner:  Josean Diaz (m) /  Maia Campbell (f)
 Harmer Throw winner:  Jerome Vega (m) /  Erica Belvit (f)
 Javelin Throw winner:  Arley Ibarguen (m) /  Coralys Ortiz (f)
  winners: International Team (///) (m) /  (f)
  winners:  (m) / International Team (/) (f)

2022 World Athletics Combined Events Tour

Bronze
 December 18 – 19, 2021: Oceania Combined Events Championships in  Brisbane
 Men's Decathlon winner:  Daniel Golubovic
 Women's Heptathlon winner:  Taneille Crase
 January 29 & 30: X-Athletics in  Aubière
 Men's Heptathlon winner:  Simon Ehammer
 Women's Pentathlon winner:  Adrianna Sułek
 February 5 & 6: Tallinn Indoor Meeting in  Tallinn
 Men's Heptathlon winner:  Hans-Christian Hausenberg
 Women's Pentathlon winner:  Adrianna Sułek

2022 World Athletics Indoor Tour

Gold
 January 28: INIT Indoor Meeting Karlsruhe in  Karlsruhe
 Women's 60 m winner:  María Isabel Pérez
 Women's 400 m winner:  Anna Kiełbasińska
 800 winners:  Elliot Giles (m) /  Halimah Nakaayi (f)
 Women's 1500 m winner:  Axumawit Embaye
 Men's 3000 winner:  Berihu Aregawi
 60 m Hurdles winners:  Pascal Martinot-Lagarde (m) /  Danielle Williams (f)
 Men's Pole Vault winner:  Armand Duplantis
 Women's High Jump winner:  Emily Borthwick
 Men's Long Jump winner:  Thobias Montler
 Men's Triple Jump winner:  Andreas Pantazis
 January 29: Millrose Games in  New York City
 Men's 60 m winner:  Christian Coleman
 Women's 400 m winner:  Wadeline Jonathas
 Men's 800 m winner:  Bryce Hoppel
 Men's 3000 m winner:  Geordie Beamish
 Women's 60 m Hurdles winner:  Britany Anderson
 Women's Long Jump winner:  Tara Davis
 February 6: New Balance Indoor Grand Prix in  New York City
 60 m winners:  Noah Lyles (m) /  Mikiah Brisco (f)
 Men's 200 m winner:  Trayvon Bromell
 Women's 300 m winner:  Gabrielle Thomas
 400 m winners:  Jereem Richards (m) /  Jessica Beard (f)
 800 m winners:  Mariano García (m) /  Natoya Goule (f)
 1500 m winners:  Colby Alexander (m) /  Esther Guerrero
 3000 m winners:  Adel Mechaal (m) /  Gabriela DeBues-Stafford (f)
 Men's 1 mile winner:  Andrew Coscoran
 60 m Hurdles winners:  Grant Holloway (m) /  Danielle Williams (f)
 Women's Long Jump winner:  Lorraine Ugen
 Men's Triple Jump winner:  Donald Scott
 February 17: Meeting Hauts-de-France Pas-de-Calais in  Liévin
 Men's 60 m winners:  Lamont Marcell Jacobs
 800 m winners:  Mariano García (m) /  Natoya Goule (f)
 Women's 1 mile winner:  Gudaf Tsegay
 Men's 1500 m winners:  Jakob Ingebrisgtsen
 Men's 2000 m winners:  Samuel Zeleke
 3000 m winners:  Lamecha Girma (m) /  Dawit Seyaum (f)
 60 m hurdles winner:  Grant Holloway (m) /  Laeticia Bapté (f)
 Pole Vault winner:  Christopher Nielsen (m) /  Anzhelika Sidorova (f)
 Women's Long Jump winner:  Yulimar Rojas
 Men's Triple Jump winner:  Lázaro Martínez
 February 19: Birmingham Indoor Grand Prix in  Birmingham
 60 m winners:  Noah Liles (m) /  Elaine Thompson (f)
 400 m winners:  Kahmari Montgomery (m) /  Stephenie Ann McPherson (f)
 800 m winners:  Collins Kipruto (m) /  Keely Hodgkinson (f)
 1500 m winners:  Abel Kipsang (m) /  Dawit Seyaum
 60 m Hurdles winners:  Grant Holloway (m) /  Zoë Sedney (f)
 Men's Pole Vault winner:  Armand Duplantis
 Women's High Jump winner:  Eleanor Patterson
 Women's Triple Jump winner:  Khaddi Sagnia
 February 22: Copernicus Cup in  Toruń
 60 m winners:  Elijah Hall (m) /  Ewa Swoboda (f)
 Women's 400 m winner:  Femke Bol 
 800 m winners:  Elliot Giles (m) /  Catriona Bisset (f)
 Women's 1500 m winners:  Gudaf Tsegay
 Men's 3000 m winners:  Lamecha Girma
 60 m Hurdles winners:  Damian Czykier (m) /  Devynne Charlton (f)
 Men's Pole Vault winner:  Ernest John Obiena
 Women's Long Jump winner:  Khaddi Sagnia
 Men's Shot put winner:  Filip Mihaljević
 March 2: World Indoor Tour Madrid in 
 Men's 60 m winners:  Elijah Hall
 Women's 400 m winner:  Justyna Święty-Ersetic 
 800 m winners:  Elliot Giles (m) /  Catriona Bisset (f)
 Women's 1500 m winners:  Gudaf Tsegay
 Men's 3000 m winners:  Selemon Barega
 60 m Hurdles winners:  Asier Martínez (m) /  Zoë Sedney (f)
 Women's High Jume winner:  Elleanor Patterson
 Triple Jump winners:  Lázaro Martínez (m) /  Yulimar Rojas (f)
 Women's Long Jump winner:  Lorraine Ugan
 Men's Shot put winner:  Konrad Bukowiecki

Silver
 January 22: Manchester World Indoor Tour in  Manchester
 60 m winners:  Andrew Robertson (m) /  Amy Hunt (f)
 Men's 400 m winner:  Edward Faulds
 800 m winners:  Ben Greenwood (m) /  Isabelle Boffey (f)
 1500 m winners:  Piers Copeland (m) /  Claudia Bobocea (f)
 3000 m winners:  Mohamad Al-Garni (m) /  Ciara Mageean (f)
 60 m Hurdles winners:  Koen Smet (m) /  Sarah Lavin (f)
 Women's Pole Vault winner:  Sophie Cook
 Men's High Jump winner:  Loïc Gasch
 Women's Long Jump winner:  Lucy Hadaway
 Shot Put winners:  Scott Lincoln (m) /  Sophie McKinna (f)
 January 30: Hvězdy v Nehvizdech in  Nehvizdy
 High Jump winners:  Thomas Carmoy (m) /  Yuliya Chumachenko (f)
 Shot Put winners:  Tomáš Staněk (m) /  Sara Gambetta (f)
 February 3: Czech Indoor Gala in  Ostrava
 60 m winners:  Jan Veleba (m) /  Molly Scott (f)
 Men's 200 m winner:  Tomáš Němejc
 400 m winners:  Edoardo Scotti (m) /  Anna Kiełbasińska (f)
 Men's 800 m winner:  Aurèle Vandeputte
 1500 m winners:  Elliot Giles (m) /  Revée Walcott-Nolan (f)
 Women's 60 m Hurdles winner:  Helena Jiranová
 Men's Long Jump winner:  Thobias Montler
 Women's Pole Vault winner:  Iryna Zhuk
 Men's Shot Put winner:  Michał Haratyk
 February 4: ISTAF Indoor in  Berlin
 60 m sprint winners:  Marcell Jacobs (m) /  Daryll Neita (f)
 60 m Hurdles winners:  Aurel Manga (m) /  Reetta Hurske (f)
 Women's Long Jump winner:  Khaddi Sagnia
 Men's Pole Vault winner:  Armand Duplantis
 February 11: ORLEN Cup Łódź in  Łódź
 60 m winners:  Marcell Jacobs (m) /  Ewa Swoboda
 60 m Hurdles winners:  Rafael Pereira (m) /  Reetta Hurske
 Men's High Jump winner:  Andriy Protsenko
 Men's Pole Vault winner:  Ernest John Obiena
 Men's Shot Put winner:  Konrad Bukowiecki
 February 12: Meeting Metz Moselle Athlélor in  Metz
 60 m winners:  Arthur Cissé (m) /  Kayla White (f)
 200 m winners:  Isayah Boers (m) /  Lieke Klaver (f)
 400 m winners:  Liemarvin Bonevacia (m) /  Femke Bol (f)
 800 m winners:  Noah Kibet (m) /  Lore Hoffmann (f)
 Men's 1500 m winner:  Abel Kipsang
 3000 m winners:  Samuel Tefera (m) /  Jetske van Kampen (f)
 60 m Hurdles winners:  Pascal Martinot-Lagarde (m) /  Zoë Sedney
 Men's Pole Vault winner:  Chris Nilsen
 Men's High Jump winner:  Kristen Biyengui
 Men's Long Jump winner:  Miltiadis Tentoglou 
 February 14: Meeting de l’Eure in  Val-de-Reuil
 60 m winners:  Michael Rodgers (m) /  Kayla White (f)
 800 m winners:  Collins Kipruto (m) /  Halimah Nakaayi (f)
 Men's 1000 m winner:  Abdelati El Guesse
 Men's 1500 m winners:  Elliot Giles
 Women's 3000 m winners:  Ayal Dagnachew
 60 m Hurdles winners:  Jarret Eaton (m) /  Teresa Errandonea
 Women's Pole Vault winner:  Tina Šutej
 Men's High Jump winner:  Loïc Gasch
 Men's Triple Jump winner:  Enzo Hodebar
 February 15: Banskobystricka latka in  Banská Bystrica
 High Jump winners:  Sanghyeok Woo (m) /  Eleanor Patterson (f)
 February 19: All Star Perche in  Aubiére
 Pole Vault winners:  Meno Vloon (m) /  Anzhelika Sidorova (f)
 February 20: ISTAF Indoor Düsseldorf in 
 60 m winners:  Artur Cissé (m) /  Ewa Swoboda (f)
 60 m Hurdles winners:  Milan Trajkovic (m) /  Nadine Visser (f)
 Women's Long Jump winner:  Malaika Mihambo 
 Men's Pole Vault winner:  Bo Kanda Lita Baehre
 March 5: Perche Elite Tour Indoor in  Rouen
 Pole Vault winners:  Christopher Nielsen (m) /  Tina Šutej (f)
 March 6: Meeting de Paris Indoor in  Paris
 60 m winners:  Michael Rodgers (m) /  Mujinga Kambundji (f)
 60 m Hurdles winners:  Wilhem Belocian (m) /  Cyréna Samba-Mayela (f)
 Men's Pole Vault winner:  Christopher Nielsen
 Triple Jump winner:  Jean-Marc Pontvianne /  Patricia Mamona
 March 7: Belgrade Indoor Meeting in  Belgrade
 60 m winners:  Ján Volko (m) /  Zaynab Dosso (f)
 400 m winners:  Šimon Bujna (m) /  Anita Horvat (f)
 Women's 800 m winners:  Louise Shanahan
 Men's 1500 m winners:  Elliot Giles
 60 m Hurdles winners:  Petr Svoboda (m) /  Ivana Lončarek (f)
 Women's High Jump winner:  Marija Vuković
 Men's Pole Vault winners:  Armand Duplantis
 Long Jump winner:  Miltiadis Tentoglou (m) /  Ivana Vuleta (f)
 Men's Shot Put winner:  Nick Ponzio

Bronze
 January 27: Kladno Indoor in  Kladno
 High Jump Indoor winners:  Majd Eddin Ghazal (m) /  Yuliya Chumachenko (f)
 Shot Put Indoor winners:  Marcus Thomsen (m) /  Fanny Roos (f)
 February 4: Meeting Elite de Miramas in  Miramas
 Men's 60 m winner:  Ferdinand Omurwa
 200 m winners:  Owen Ansah (m) /  Ida Karstoft (f)
 Men's 400 m winner:  Julien Watrin
 Men's 1500 m winner:  Ossama Meslek
 Women's 3000 m winner:  Luiza Gega
 60 m Hurdles winners:  Pascal Martinot-Lagarde (m) /  Evonne Britton (f)
 Men's High Jump winner:  Loïc Gasch
 Triple Jump winners:  Simo Lipsanen (m) /  Leyanis Pérez (f)
 Shot Put winners:  Frédéric Dagée (m) /  Yemisi Ogunleye (f)
 February 4 & 5: Dr. Sander Invitational in  New York City
 400 m winners:  Wellington Ventura (m) /  Stephanie Davis (f)
 800 m winners:  Shane Streich (m) /  Sage Hurta (f)
 1500 m winners:  Colin Sahlman (m) /  Alma Cortés (f)
 Men's 3000 m winner:  Dan Schafer
 Men's Pole Vault winner:  Zach McWhorter
 High Jump winners:  Keenon Laine (m) /  Amina Smith (f)
 Men's Long Jump winner:  Marquis Dendy
 Women's Triple Jump winner:  Tori Franklin
 Women's Shot Put winner:  Sarah Mitton
 February 5: Hustopečské skákání in  Hustopečské
 High Jump Winners:  Sanghyeok Woo (m) /  Emily Borthwick (f)
 February 5: Dynamic New Athletics Indoor Match in  Glasgow
 60 m winners:  Andrew Robertson (m) /  María Isabel Pérez (f)
 Women's 800 m winner:  Jenny Selman
 60 m Hurdles winners:  Enrique Llopis (m) /  Teresa Errandonea (f)
 Men's High Jump winner:  Xesc Tresens
 Women's Long Jump winner:  Evelise Veiga
 Men's Shot Put winner:  Francisco Belo
 Mixed 2x2x200 m winners:  (Thomas Somers, Amy Hillyard)
 Mixed  winners:  (Iñaki Cañal, Aauri Bokesa, Sara Gallego, Bernat Erta)
 February 5: Hustopečské skákání in  Hustopeče
 High Jump winners:  Woo Sang-hyeok (m) /  Emily Borthwick (f)
 February 9: Meeting d'Athlétisme de Mondeville in  Mondeville
 60 m winners:  Cravont Charleston (m) /  Michelle-Lee Ahye (f)
 400 m winners:  Mazen Al-Yassin (m) /  Ama Pipi (f)
 Women's 1500 m winner:  Netsanet Desta
 Men's 3000 m winner:  Daniel Ebenyo
 60 m Hurdles winners:  Wilhem Belocian (m) /  Laëticia Bapté (f)
 Women's High Jump winner:  Emily Borthwick
 Women's Triple Jump winner:  Rouguy Diallo
 Women's Pole Vault winner:  Jacob Wooten
 February 12: PSD Bank Indoor Meeting in  Dortmund
 60 m winners:  Joris van Gool (m) /  Gina Lückenkemper (f)
 Women's 200 m winner:  Lilly Kaden
 400 m winners:  Pavel Maslák &  Mihai Sorin Dringo (m) /  Justyna Święty-Ersetic (f)
 Women's 800 m winner:  Eglay Nafuna Nalyanya
 1500 m winners:  Isaac Nader (m) /  Eleanor Fulton (f)
 Men's 3000 m winner:  Abrham Sime
 Women's Long Jump winner:  Merle Homeier
 Men's Pole Vault winner:  KC Lightfoot
 February 12: American Track League #1 in  Louisville
 60 m winners:  Emmanuel Matadi (m) /  Kiara Parker (f)
 Women's 200 m winner:  Jasmine Camacho-Quinn
 300 m winners:  Kahmari Montgomery (m) /  Kyra Constantine (f)
 800 m winners:  Erik Sowinski (m) /  Charlene Lipsey (f)
 1000 m winners:  Shane Streich (m) /  Danae Rivers (f)
 3000 m winners:  Rory Linkletter (m) /  Emma Grace Hurley (f)
 60 m Hurdles winners:  Devon Allen (m) /  Britany Anderson (f)
 Women's High Jump winner:  Vashti Cunningham
 Women's Pole Vault winner:  Sandi Morris
 Men's Shot Put winner:  Josh Awotunde
 March 6: World Tune-Up – Adam Sanford Pro in  New York
 60 m winners:  Miles Lewis (m) /  Khamica Bingham (f)
 Men's 200 m winner:  Ezequil Suarez Hidalgo
 400 m winners:  Arinze Chance (m) /  Junelle Bromfield (f)
 800 m winners:  Marco Arop (m)
 Women's 3000 m winners:  Laura Galván
 Women's 60 m Hurdles winners:  Danielle Williams 
 Women's Long Jump winner:  Chanice Porter
 Cancelled: LLN Indoor in  Louvain-la-Neuve
 TBD: Chinese Indoor Tour Round #1 in  Chengdu
 TBD: Chinese Indoor Tour Round #2 in  Chengdu

Challenger
 February 6: RIG Games in  Reykjavík
 60 m winners:  Birgir Jóhannes Jónsson (m) /  Naomi Sedney (f)
 200 m winners:  Gudmundur August Thoroddsen (m) /  Guðbjörg Jóna Bjarnadóttir (f)
 400 m winners:  Dagur Fannar Einarsson (m) /  Milja Thureson (f)
 800 m winners:  Samundur Ólafsson (m) /  Ísold Sævarsdóttir (f)
 High Jump winners:  Kristján Viggó Sigfinnsson (m) /  Eva María Baldursdóttir (f)
 Long Jump winners:  Daníel Ingi Egilsson (m) /  Hildigunnur Þórarinsdóttir (f)
 Shot Put winners:  Sven Poelmann (m) /  Chase Ealey (f)
 February 9: Beijer Stavhoppsgala in  Uppsala
 Winner:  Armand Duplantis
 February 13: Nordic Indoor Match in  Uppsala
 60 m winners:  Even Meinseth (m) /  Claudia Payton (f)
 200 m winners:  Zion Eriksson (m) /  Ida Karstoft (f)
 400 m winners:  Carl Bengtström (m) /  Linn Oppegaard (f)
 800 m winners:  Erik Martinsson (m) /  Sara Kuivisto (f)
 1500 m winners:  Mats Hauge (m) /  Sara Christiansson (f)
 3000 m winners:  Jonathan Grahn (m) /  Sofía Thørgersen (f)
 60 m hurdles winners:  Ilari Manninen (m) /  Mette Graversgaard (f)
 High Jump winners:  Fabian Delryd (m) /  Louise Ekman (f)
 Pole Vault winners:  Pål Haugen Lillefosse (m) /  Caroline Bonde Holm (f)
 Long Jump winners:  Thobias Montler (m) /  Tilde Johansson (f)
 Triple Jump winners:  Gabriel Wallmark (m) /  Rebecka Abrahamsson (f)
 Shot Put winners:  Marcus Thomsen (m) /  Fanny Roos (f)

2021–2022 World Athletics Cross Country Tour

Gold
 October 16, 2021: Cardiff Cross Challenge in  Cardiff
 Winners:  Hugo Milner (m) /  Charlotte Arter (f)
 October 24, 2021: Cross Internacional Zornoza in  Amorebieta-Etxano
 Winners:  Awet Habte (m) /  Francine Niyomukunzi (f)
 October 31, 2021: Cross Internacional de Soria in  Soria
 Winners:  Rodrigue Kwizera (m) /  Lucy Mawia (f)
 November 14, 2021: Cross de Atapuerca in  Atapuerca
 Winners:  Aron Kifle (m) /  Rahel Daniel (f)
 November 21, 2021: Cross Internacional de Itálica in  Sevilla
 Winners:  Rodrigue Kwizera (m) /  Norah Jeruto (f)
 November 28, 2021: Cross Internacional de la Constitución in  Alcobendas
 Winners:  Abdessamad Oukhelfen (m) /  Dolshi Tesfu (f)
 December 4, 2021: Mt. SAC Cross Country Invitational in  Walnut
 Winners:  Dillon Maggard (m) /  Allie Buchalski (f)
 December 19, 2021: Cross Internacional de Venta de Baños in  Venta de Baños
 Winners:  Rodrigue Kwizera (m) /  Edinah Jebitok (f)
 January 6: Campaccio in  San Giorgio su Legnano
 Winners:  Addisu Yihune (m) /  Dawit Seyaum (f)
 January 9: Juan Muguerza Cross-Country Race in  Elgoibar
 Winners:  Nicholas Kimeli (m) /  Edinah Jebitok (f)
 January 30: Cinque Mulini in  San Vittore Olona
 Winners:  Nibret Melak (m) /  Teresia Muthoni Gateri (f)
 February 12: Agnes Tirop Cross Country Classic in  Eldoret 
 Winners:  Samuel Chebole (m) /  Joyce Chepkemoi Tele (f)
 February 20: Lotto Cross Cup de Hannut in  Hannut
 Winners:  Samuel Fitwi (m) /  Peruth Chemutai (f)
 February 27: Cross das Amendoeiras em Flor in  Albufeira
 Winners:  Rodrigue Kwizera (m) /  Rahel Daniel (f)
 March 6: Gran Premio Cáceres Campo a Través in  Serradilla
 Winners:  Thierry Ndikumwenayo (m) /  Yasemin Can (f)

Silver
 September 25, 2021: TCS Lidingöloppet in  Lidingö
 Winners:  Samuel Russom (m) /  Sylvia Mboga Medugu (f)
 November 28, 2021: International Warandecross Tilburg in  Tilburg
 Winners:  Jonas Raess (m) /  Meraf Bahta (f)
 January 22: Northern Ireland International Cross Country in  Belfast (final)
 Winners:  Zakariya Mahamed (m) /  Hellen Obiri (f)

Bronze
 November 7, 2021: Cross de San Sebastián in  San Sebastián
 Winners:  Rodrigue Kwizera (m) /  Zenebu Fikadu (f)
 November 7, 2021: CrossCup de Mol in  Mol
 Winners:  Ruben Querinjean (m) /  Elise Vanderelst (f)
 February 6: Cross della Vallagarina in  Rovereto (final)
 Winners:  Tadese Takele (m) /  Klara Lukan (f)
 March 6: Brussels CrossCup in  Bruxelles (final)
 Winners:  Michael Somers (m) /  Mieke Gorissen (f)

2021–22 World Athletics Race Walking Tour

Bronze
 December 19, 2021: Open Irish 35 km Race Walking Championships in  Dublin
 Winners:  Perseus Karlström (m) /  Agnieszka Ellward (f)
 January 8: Ecuadorian Race Walking Championships in  Machala
 35 km winners:  Brian Pintado (m) /  Magaly Bonilla (f)
 20 km winners:  Jordy Jiménez (m) /  Glenda Morejón (f)
 January 16: USA Open 35 km Race Walking Championships in  Santee
 Winners:  Nick Christie (m) /  Miranda Melville (f)
 January 22: Turkish Open 20 km & 35 km Race Walking Championships in  Antalya
 Men's 35 km winner:  Michal Morvay
 20 km winners:  Şahin Şenoduncu (m) /  Galina Yakusheva (f)
 January 30: Spanish Open 35 km Race Walking Championships in  Lepe
 Winners:  Miguel Ángel López (m) /  María Pérez (f)
 January 30:  in  Coatzacoalcos
 20 km winners:  Noel Chama (m) /  Alegna González (f)
 35 km winners:  Ricardo Ortiz (m) /  Ilse Guerrero (f)
 February 13: Oceania Open 20 km Race Walking Championships in  Adelaide
 Winners:  Declan Tingay (m) /  Jemima Montag (f)
 February 13: Spanish Open 20 km Race Walking Championships in  Pamplona
 Winners:  Alberto Amezcua (m) /  María Pérez (f)
 March 20: 2022  Asian 20 km Race Walking Championships  Nomi
 Women's 5 km winners:  Satsuki Nakano
 Men's 10 km winners:  Atsuki Tsuchiya
 20 km winners:  Daisuke Matsunga (m) /  Serena Sonoda (f)

References

 
Athletics
2022